Edward King (July 10, 1885 – June 10, 1970) was a Canadian professional ice hockey player from Calgary. He played with the Ottawa Senators of the National Hockey Association during the 1911–12 season.

References

1885 births
1970 deaths
Ice hockey people from the Northwest Territories
Ottawa Senators (NHA) players
Ice hockey people from Calgary
Canadian ice hockey left wingers